Agyneta adami is a species of sheet weaver found in Brazil. It was described by Millidge in 1991.

References

adami
Spiders described in 1991
Spiders of Brazil